Freesia is a genus of herbaceous perennial flowering plants in the family Iridaceae, first described as a genus in 1866 by Christian Friedrich Ecklon (1886) and named after the German botanist and medical practitioner, Friedrich Freese (1795-1876). It is native to the eastern side of southern Africa, from Kenya south to South Africa, most species being found in Cape Provinces. Species of the former genus Anomatheca are now included in Freesia. The plants commonly known as "freesias", with fragrant funnel-shaped flowers, are cultivated hybrids of a number of Freesia species. Some other species are also grown as ornamental plants.

Description
Many species have fragrant narrowly funnel-shaped flowers, although those formerly placed in the genus Anomatheca, such as F. laxa, have flat flowers.

Freesias are used as food plants by the larvae of some Lepidoptera species including the large yellow underwing.

Systematics
The genus was named in honor of Friedrich Heinrich Theodor Freese (1795–1876), a German physician.

 Species

 Freesia andersoniae L.Bolus  - the Cape Provinces, Free State
 Freesia caryophyllacea (Burm.f.) N.E.Br. (syn. F. elimensis L.Bolus, F. parva N.E.Br., F. xanthospila (DC.) Klatt) - Heuningrug region in the Cape Provinces
 Freesia corymbosa (Burm.f.) N.E.Br. (syn. F. armstrongii W.Watson, F. brevis N.E.Br.)  - the Cape Provinces
 Freesia fergusoniae L.Bolus  - the Cape Provinces
 Freesia fucata J.C.Manning & Goldblatt - Hoeks River Valley in the Cape Provinces
 Freesia grandiflora (Baker) Klatt - Zaire, Tanzania, Malawi, Mozambique, Zambia, Zimbabwe, Eswatini, northeastern South Africa 
 Freesia laxa (Thunb.) Goldblatt & J.C.Manning (syn. F. cruenta (Lindl.) Klatt) - from Rwanda + Kenya south to the Cape Provinces; naturalized in Madeira, Mauritius, Réunion, Australia, Florida, Argentina
 Freesia leichtlinii Klatt (syn. F. middlemostii F.Barker, F. muirii N.E.Br.) - the Cape Provinces; naturalized in Corsica, California, Florida, Argentina
 Freesia marginata J.C.Manning & Goldblatt  - the Cape Provinces
 Freesia occidentalis L.Bolus (syn. F. framesii L.Bolus)  - the Cape Provinces
 Freesia praecox J.C.Manning & Goldblatt - the Cape Provinces
 Freesia refracta (Jacq.) Klatt (syn. F. hurlingii L.Bolus) - the Cape Provinces; naturalized in France, Canary Islands, Madeira, Bermuda, St. Helena
 Freesia sparrmanii (Thunb.) N.E.Br. - Langeberg in the Cape Provinces
 Freesia speciosa L.Bolus (syn. F. flava (E.Phillips & N.E.Br.) N.E.Br.)  - the Cape Provinces
 Freesia verrucosa (B.Vogel) Goldblatt & J.C.Manning (syn. F. juncea (Pourr.) Klatt) - the Cape Provinces
 Freesia viridis (Aiton) Goldblatt & J.C.Manning  - Namibia, the Cape Provinces

Species of the former genus Anomatheca are now included in Freesia:
 Anomatheca cruenta Lindl. = Freesia laxa subsp. laxa
 Anomatheca grandiflora Baker = Freesia grandiflora
 Anomatheca juncea (Pourr.) Ker Gawl. = Freesia verrucosa
 Anomatheca laxa (Thunb.) Goldblatt = Freesia laxa
 Anomatheca verrucosa (B.Vogel) Goldblatt = Freesia verrucosa
 Anomatheca viridis (Aiton) Goldblatt = Freesia viridis
 Anomatheca xanthospila (DC.) Ker Gawl. = Freesia caryophyllacea

Cultivation and uses
The plants usually called "freesias" in horticulture and floristry are derived from crosses made in the 19th century between Freesia refracta and Freesia leichtlinii. Numerous cultivars have been bred from these species and the pink- and yellow-flowered forms of Freesia corymbosa. Modern tetraploid cultivars have flowers ranging from white to yellow, pink, red and blue-mauve. They are mostly cultivated professionally in the Netherlands by about 80 growers. Freesias can be readily increased from seed. Due to their specific and pleasing scent, they are often used in hand creams, shampoos, candles, etc.; however, the flowers themselves are mainly used in wedding bouquets.

Freesia laxa (formerly called Lapeirousia laxa or Anomatheca cruenta) is one of the other species of the genus which is commonly cultivated. Smaller than the scented freesia cultivars, it has flat rather than cup-shaped flowers.

References

Bibliography

 
 Goldblatt, P. (1982) Systematics of Freesia Klatt (Iridaceae) J. South African Bot. 48:39-93.

External links
 
 
 Freesias photos of International Bulb Society
 Freesias photos of Pacific Bulb Society
 PlantZAfrica: Freesia
 Freesia info and pictures  
 How to grow freesia in warm climates

 
Iridaceae genera
Flora of Africa
seedless Lemon Plant